MFK Ružomberok is a Slovak football club, playing in the city of Ružomberok.

History

Established in 1906, the club's colours have been traditionally white, yellow and red, which are also featured on the town's flag. However, the sponsor Mondi Business Paper SCP introduced new colours in 2005: orange, black and white.

In 1993 the club gained promotion to the Slovak Second Division for the first time and a second promotion to the Corgoň Liga in 1997. The club's trophy cabinet stayed empty until their centenary year, when in 2006 they lifted both the Corgoň Liga title and the Slovak Cup with the help of 21 goals from the league's joint top scorer Erik Jendrišek. Other stars of the team in this successful season were Jan Nezmar and Marek Sapara. The team was coached at that time by František Komňacký who in February 2007 went on to SKVO Rostov-on-Don.Corgoň liga: Komňacký v Ružomberku skončil

The league win gained them entry into the Champions league second qualifying stage, there they met Swedish side Djurgårdens IF, Ružomberok lost the first leg 1–0 but managed to pull back the deficit to win 3–2 on aggregate. The next round saw them meet Russian champions CSKA Moscow, the team lost conceding 5 goals without reply.

Events timeline
 1906 – Founded as Rózsahegyi Sport Club
 1948 – Merged with SBZ Ruzomberok and Sokola SBZ Ružomberok
 1953 – Renamed DSO Iskra Ružomberok
 1955 – Revocation of the merger and renamed Iskra Ružomberok
 1957 – Renamed TJ BZVIL Ružomberok
 1989 – Renamed TJ BZ Ružomberok
 1992 – Renamed ŠK Texicom Ružomberok
 1995 – Renamed MŠK Ružomberok
 1996 – Renamed MŠK SCP Ružomberok, Slovak 2nd League champion
 2001 – First European qualification, 2001–02 Manchester Spring ClassicCup
 2003 – Renamed MFK Ružomberok
 2006 – Slovak champion, Slovak FA Cup winner
 2006 – Champions League qualification, 3rd round
2017 - European League qualification, 3rd round

Honours

Domestic
 Slovak Super Liga (1993–)
  Winners (1): 2005–06
  Runners-up (1): 2021–22
 Slovenský Pohár (Slovak Cup)
  Winners (1): 2005–06
  Runners-up (3): 2000–01, 2017–18, 2019–20

Slovak League Top Goalscorer
Slovak League Top scorer since 1993–94

1Shared award

Transfers

MFK have produced numerous players that have gone on to represent the Slovak national football team. Over the last period there has been a steady increase of young players leaving Ružomberok after a few years of first-team football and moving on to play football in leagues of a higher standard, mostly Czech First League (Igor Žofčák and Juraj Kucka to Sparta Prague in 2007 and 2009, Maroš Klimpl and Tomáš Oravec to Viktoria Žižkov in 2001 and 2002, Dušan Švento to SK Slavia Prague in 2005, Marián Had to Brno in 2004, Marek Bakoš to Viktoria Plzeň in 2009, and Tomáš Ďubek to Slovan Liberec in 2014), Belgian Pro League (Martin Regáli to K.V. Kortrijk in 2023). In 2005–06 best goalscorer Erik Jendrišek moved to German Hannover 96. In 2017 Michal Faško moved to Swiss Grasshopper. The top transfer was agreed in 2006 when 24 years old attacking midfielder Marek Sapara moved to Norwegian champion Rosenborg BK for a fee €1.3 million.

Record transfers

*-unofficial fee

Sponsorship

Club partners 
source

Mondi SCP
ECO-INVEST
Harmony

TAURIS
Harmanec-Kuvert
City of Ružomberok

Stavpoč
Tatrapeko
Včela Lippek

Current squad
Updated 10 February 2023

For recent transfers, see List of Slovak football transfers winter 2022-23.

Out on loan

Other players under contract

Retired number(s)

 12 – Concordia 1906 (the 12th Man)

Staff

Results

League and Cup history
Slovak League only (1993–present)
{|class="wikitable"
! style="color:black; background:#F15E2A;"| Season
! style="color:black; background:#F15E2A;"| Division (Name)
! style="color:black; background:#F15E2A;"| Pos./Teams
! style="color:black; background:#F15E2A;"| Pl.
! style="color:black; background:#F15E2A;"| W
! style="color:black; background:#F15E2A;"| D
! style="color:black; background:#F15E2A;"| L
! style="color:black; background:#F15E2A;"| GS
! style="color:black; background:#F15E2A;"| GA
! style="color:black; background:#F15E2A;"| P
! style="color:black; background:#F15E2A;"|Slovak Cup
! style="color:black; background:#F15E2A;" colspan=2|Europe
! style="color:black; background:#F15E2A;"|Top Scorer (Goals)
|-
|align=center|1993–94
|align=center|2nd (1. Liga)
|align=center|11/(16)
|align=center|30
|align=center|12
|align=center|5
|align=center|13
|align=center|48
|align=center|53
|align=center|29
|align=center|First round
|align=center|
|align=center|
|align=center|
|-
|align=center|1994–95
|align=center|2nd (1. Liga)
|align=center|6/(16)
|align=center|30
|align=center|14
|align=center|2
|align=center|14
|align=center|47
|align=center|33
|align=center|44
|align=center|First round
|align=center|
|align=center|
|align=center|
|-
|-
|align=center|1995–96
|align=center|2nd (1. Liga)
|align=center|6/(16) 
|align=center|30
|align=center|14
|align=center|5
|align=center|11
|align=center|54
|align=center|44
|align=center|47
|align=center|First round
|align=center|
|align=center|
|align=center| Eduard Mydliar (13)
|-
|align=center|1996–97
|align=center|2nd (1. Liga)
|align=center bgcolor=green|1/(18)
|align=center|34
|align=center|23
|align=center|5
|align=center|6
|align=center|78
|align=center|19
|align=center|78
|align=center|Semi-finals
|align=center|
|align=center|
|align=center| Viliam Hýravý (18)
|-
|align=center|1997–98
|align=center|1st (Mars Superliga)
|align=center|11/(16)
|align=center|30
|align=center|9
|align=center|9
|align=center|12
|align=center|35
|align=center|49
|align=center|36
|align=center|First round
|align=center|
|align=center| 
|align=center|  Eduard Mydliar (7)
|-
|align=center|1998–99
|align=center|1st (Mars Superliga)
|align=center|7/(16)
|align=center|30
|align=center|12
|align=center|10
|align=center|8
|align=center|31
|align=center|31
|align=center|46
|align=center|Quarter-finals
|align=center|
|align=center|
|align=center|  Eduard Mydliar (9)
|-
|align=center|1999–00
|align=center|1st (Mars Superliga)
|align=center|7/(16)
|align=center|30
|align=center|13
|align=center|7
|align=center|10
|align=center|29
|align=center|26
|align=center|46
|align=center|Second round
|align=center| 
|align=center|
|align=center|  Eduard Mydliar (7)
|-
|align=center|2000–01
|align=center|1st (Mars Superliga)
|align=center bgcolor=tan|3/(10)
|align=center|36
|align=center|15
|align=center|10
|align=center|11
|align=center|51
|align=center|48
|align=center|55
|align=center bgcolor=silver|Runners-up
|align=center|
|align=center|
|align=center|  Tomáš Oravec (11) 
|-
|align=center|2001–02
|align=center|1st (Mars Superliga)
|align=center|4/(10)
|align=center|36
|align=center|15
|align=center|9
|align=center|12
|align=center|49
|align=center|41
|align=center|54
|align=center|Second round
|align=center|UC
|align=center|R1 ( Troyes)
|align=center|  Tomáš Oravec (9) 
|-
|align=center|2002–03
|align=center|1st (Slovak Super Liga)
|align=center|8/(10)
|align=center|36
|align=center|12
|align=center|7
|align=center|17
|align=center|45
|align=center|60
|align=center|43
|align=center|First round
|align=center|
|align=center|
|align=center| Roland Števko (12)
|-
|align=center|2003–04
|align=center|1st (Corgoň Liga)
|align=center bgcolor=tan|3/(10)
|align=center|36
|align=center|15
|align=center|10
|align=center|11
|align=center|53
|align=center|47
|align=center|55
|align=center|First round
|align=center|
|align=center|
|align=center| Roland Števko (22)
|-
|align=center|2004–05
|align=center|1st (Corgoň Liga)
|align=center|7/(10)
|align=center|36
|align=center|11
|align=center|10
|align=center|15
|align=center|50
|align=center|57
|align=center|43
|align=center|Second round
|align=center|
|align=center|
|align=center|  Roland Števko (11)
|-
|align=center|2005–06
|align=center|1st (Corgoň Liga)
|align=center bgcolor=gold|1/(10)
|align=center|36
|align=center|26
|align=center|2
|align=center|8
|align=center|65
|align=center|28
|align=center|80
|align=center bgcolor=gold|Winners
|align=center|
|align=center|
|align=center|  Erik Jendrišek (21)
|-
|align=center|2006–07
|align=center|1st (Corgoň Liga)
|align=center|4/(12)
|align=center|28
|align=center|10
|align=center|7
|align=center|11
|align=center|25
|align=center|29
|align=center|37
|align=center|Second round
|align=center|CLUC
|align=center|QR3 (  CSKA Moscow)R1  (Club Brugge)
|align=center|  Róbert Rák (11)
|-
|align=center|2007–08
|align=center|1st (Corgoň Liga)
|align=center|7/(12)
|align=center|33
|align=center|10
|align=center|14
|align=center|9
|align=center|46
|align=center|43
|align=center|44
|align=center|Third round
|align=center|
|align=center|
|align=center|  Marek Bakoš (10)
|-
|align=center|2008–09
|align=center|1st (Corgoň Liga)
|align=center|5/(12)
|align=center|33
|align=center|12
|align=center|11
|align=center|10
|align=center|48
|align=center|34
|align=center|47
|align=center|Semi-finals
|align=center|
|align=center| 
|align=center|  Miloš Lačný (11)
|-
|align=center|2009–10
|align=center|1st (Corgoň Liga)
|align=center|5/(12)
|align=center|33
|align=center|13
|align=center|8
|align=center|12
|align=center|33
|align=center|35
|align=center|47
|align=center|Third round
|align=center|
|align=center|
|align=center|  Oleksandr Pyschur (11)
|-
|align=center|2010–11
|align=center|1st (Corgoň Liga)
|align=center|7/(12)
|align=center|33
|align=center|10
|align=center|11
|align=center|12
|align=center|23
|align=center|33
|align=center|41
|align=center|Quarter-finals
|align=center|
|align=center|
|align=center|  Karel Kroupa (5)
|-
|align=center|2011–12
|align=center|1st (Corgoň Liga)
|align=center|6/(12)
|align=center|33
|align=center|11
|align=center|11
|align=center|11
|align=center|39
|align=center|34
|align=center|44
|align=center|Second round
|align=center| 
|align=center|
|align=center|  Pavol Masaryk (18)
|-
|align=center|2012–13
|align=center|1st (Corgoň Liga)
|align=center|6/(12)
|align=center|33
|align=center|12
|align=center|9
|align=center|12
|align=center|36
|align=center|46
|align=center|45
|align=center|Quarter-finals
|align=center|
|align=center|
|align=center|  Tomáš Ďubek (13) 
|-
|align=center|2013–14
|align=center|1st (Corgoň Liga)
|align=center|4/(12)
|align=center|33
|align=center|15
|align=center|5
|align=center|13
|align=center|56
|align=center|51
|align=center|50
|align=center|Semi-finals
|align=center|
|align=center|
|align=center|  Léandre Tawamba (13)
|-
|align=center|2014–15
|align=center|1st (Fortuna Liga)
|align=center|7/(12)
|align=center|33
|align=center|10
|align=center|10
|align=center|13
|align=center|41
|align=center|45
|align=center|40
|align=center|Second round
|align=center|
|align=center|
|align=center|  Pavol Masaryk (9)
|-
|align=center|2015–16
|align=center|1st (Fortuna Liga)
|align=center|6/(12)
|align=center|33
|align=center|12
|align=center|9
|align=center|12
|align=center|42
|align=center|41
|align=center|45
|align=center|Semi-finals
|align=center| 
|align=center|
|align=center|  Miloš Lačný (10)
|-
|align=center|2016–17
|align=center|1st (Fortuna Liga)
|align=center bgcolor=tan|3/(12)
|align=center|30
|align=center|15
|align=center|7
|align=center|8
|align=center|55
|align=center|38
|align=center|52
|align=center|Fifth Round
|align=center| 
|align=center|
|align=center|  Jakub Mareš (14)
|-
|align=center|2017–18
|align=center|1st (Fortuna Liga)
|align=center |6/(12)
|align=center|31
|align=center|10
|align=center|10
|align=center|11
|align=center|36
|align=center|35
|align=center|40
|align=center bgcolor=silver|Runners-up
|align=center| EL
|align=center| Q3 (  Everton)
|align=center|  Nermin Haskić (7)
|-
|align=center|2018–19
|align=center|1st (Fortuna Liga)
|align=center bgcolor=tan|3/(12)
|align=center|32
|align=center|15
|align=center|11
|align=center|6
|align=center|50
|align=center|31
|align=center|56
|align=center|Fifth Round
|align=center| 
|align=center| 
|align=center|  Ismar Tandir (9)   Kristi Qose (9)
|-
|align=center|2019–20
|align=center|1st (Fortuna Liga)
|align=center|5/(12)
|align=center|27
|align=center|7
|align=center|11
|align=center|9
|align=center|28
|align=center|33
|align=center|32
|align=center bgcolor=silver|Runners-up
|align=center| EL
|align=center| Q1 (  Levski Sofia)
|align=center|  Filip Twardzik (7)
|-
|align=center|2020–21
|align=center|1st (Fortuna Liga)
|align=center|8/(12)
|align=center|32
|align=center|10
|align=center|9
|align=center|13
|align=center|41
|align=center|44
|align=center|39
|align=center|Round of 16
|align=center| EL
|align=center| Q1 (  Servette)
|align=center|  Martin Regáli (11)
|-
|align=center|2021–22
|align=center|1st (Fortuna Liga)
|align=center bgcolor=silver|2/(12)
|align=center|32
|align=center|17
|align=center|12
|align=center|3
|align=center|58
|align=center|23
|align=center|63
|align=center|Round of 16
|align=center| 
|align=center| 
|align=center|  Martin Regáli (10)
|}

European competition history

Player records

Most goals

Players whose name is listed in bold are still active.

Notable players

Had international caps for their respective countries. Players whose name is listed in bold represented their countries while playing for MFK.
  	
Past (and present) players who are the subjects of Wikipedia articles can be found here.

Managers

 Ladislav Jurkemik (1998–99)
 Mikuláš Komanický (2001–02)
 Jozef Vukušič (2003–04)
 Ľubomír Moravčík (2004–05)
 František Komňacký (2005–07)
 Petr Uličný (2007)
 Přemysl Bičovský (2007–08)
 Ladislav Jurkemik (2008)
 Michal Bílek (1 July 2008 – 30 Jun 2009)
 František Straka (1 Jun 2009 – 30 Jun 2010)
 Ladislav Jurkemik (1 July 2010 – 15 Oct 2010)
 Goran Milojević (16 Oct 2010 – 31 Mar 2011)
 Ladislav Jurkemik (1 Apr 2011 – Sep 22, 2011)
 Aleš Křeček (Sept 22, 2011 – 30 June 2012)
 Ladislav Šimčo (1 July 2012 – 30 June 2013)
 Jozef Vukušič (1 July 2013 – 17 March 2014)
 Jozef Chovanec (17 Mar 2014 – 30 Jun 2014)
 Ladislav Šimčo (5 June 2014 – 17 Nov 2014)
 Ivan Galád (17 Nov 2014 – Sept 2, 2015)
 Ladislav Pecko (Sept 11, 2015 – 30 May 2016)
 Norbert Hrnčár (30 May 2016 – 30 May 2018)
 David Holoubek (4 June 2018 – May 2019)
 Ján Haspra (May 2019 - 27 May 2021)
 Peter Struhár (31 May 2021 – present)

Reserve team
MFK Ružomberok B is the reserve team of MFK Ružomberok. The team was

History
Ružomberok B's best result in Slovak 2. liga was a 7th position in 2009–10 season and 2011–12 season. In May 2012 the club withdrew from the Slovak 2. liga. Their place in the league was taken by FC ŠTK 1914 Šamorín. Notable former players which later played First league were: Štefan Pekár, Libor Hrdlička, Juraj Dovičovič, Lukáš Greššák, Juraj Dovičovič and Roland Števko.

Season to season

4 seasons in Slovak 2. liga

Former managers
  Ivan Hucko (2004–05)
  Ladislav Molnár (2008)
  Roman Berta
  Ján Haspra
  Vladimír Rusnák (2011–12)
  Viliam Hýravý

See also
Slovak football clubs in European competitions

References

External links 
Official website:
 MFK Ružomberok official website 

Other useful links:
 FB website of MFK Ružomberok 
 FB website of Concordia 1906 – Ružafans supporters 
 FB discussion of Concordia 1906 – Ružafans supporters 
 Website of Orange White Division supporters 
 Youtube channel of Concordia 1906 – Ružafans supporters 
 Youtube channel of Orange White Division supporters 

 
Football clubs in Slovakia
MFK Ruzomberok
Association football clubs established in 1906
1906 establishments in Slovakia
Sport in Žilina Region